Maha Alasaker is a Kuwaiti photographer based in New York City. She is known for her project Women of Kuwait, a project focusing on capturing photos of Kuwaiti women in their bedrooms. Her work has been in exhibitions in New York City, Kuwait, London, and the United Arab Emirates.

Life and work 
Alasaker was born in Kuwait. She started her career as a freelance photographer in 2008 before working with Marie Claire magazine in Kuwait. In 2013, she moved to New York City and studied photography at the International Center of Photography.

Exhibitions 
 Women of Kuwait (2017)
 Feminisms From the Arab and Muslim Diaspora (2017)
 Transcendence (2017)
 Abolish 153 (2016)
 Les Lieux at SoAm Studio (2015)
 Art on Paper (2015)
 Miami Project (2014)
 ArtWalk Auction – The 20th anniversary (2014)

References 

Kuwaiti photographers
Kuwaiti women photographers
1977 births
Living people